When The World Falls Down is the first album by British metal band Balance of Power. Released in 1997, it was the group's only album to feature Tony Ritchie as the lead vocalist.

Production and recording 

The album was produced by band members Lionel Hicks and Paul Curtis. It was recorded at POD Studios in London, England. In 1997, it was released in Japan on Pony Canyon Records. Later, it was released in Europe on Point Music.

The album cover, designed by Crusoe, features the Lincoln Memorial with the Balance of Power logo on the base.

A music video directed by Martin Talbot was produced for the track "Against the Odds", and the track would later be featured on the band's compilation album Heathenology.

Track listing 
 "96.11.28;14:00" – 0:48
 "Against the Odds" – 5:08
 "Overnight Sensation" – 4:31
 "Can't Close the Book" – 5:06
 "Hide Your Heart" – 5:43
 "Balance of Power" – 6:10
 "Don't Wait Until Tomorrow" – 5:26
 "Something For Your Head" – 5:56
 "When Love Is on Your Side" – 7:00
 "The Real Thing (Carry on Dreaming)" – 6:36
 "These Are the Days" – 5:07
 "Summer's Over" – 5:10
 "If Ever" (Japan Bonus Track) – 4:35

Personnel

Band members 
 Tony Ritchie – lead vocals
 Paul Curtis – guitar
 Bill Yates – guitar
 Ivan Gunn – keyboards
 Chris Dale – bass
 Lionel Hicks – drums

Additional contributions 
 Doogie White – vocals
 Tony O'Hara – vocals

Production and recording 
 Lionel Hicks – producer, engineer
 Paul Curtis – producer, engineer
 Michael Schaub – producer, engineer (*)
 Crusoe – art design

References

External links 
When the World Falls Down on Metal Archives website
When the World Falls Down on Amazon
When the World Falls Down on AllMusic

1997 debut albums
Balance of Power (band) albums